Kreischa is a municipality in the Sächsische Schweiz-Osterzgebirge district, Saxony, Germany. It directly borders the Saxon capital Dresden and consists of 14 districts.

Kreischa was first mentioned in 1282 in the name Heinricus de Kryschowe. The name could be derived from an Old Slavic word meaning "crooked" or "lame".

Sister cities
Kreischa is twinned with:
  Loffenau district Rastatt, Baden-Württemberg, Germany since 1990

Municipality subdivisions

Babisnau
Bärenklause 
Brösgen 
Gombsen
Kautzsch 
Kleba 
Kleincarsdorf 
Lungkwitz 
Quohren 
Saida 
Sobrigau
Theisewitz 
Kreischa-Wittgensdorf
Zscheckwitz

References